The 2021 US Open – Men's Singles Qualifying was a series of tennis matches from 24 August 2021 to 27 August 2021 where 128 players compete to determine the 16 qualifiers into the main draw of the 2021 US Open men's singles tournament, and, if necessary, the lucky losers. Due to pandemic-related restrictions, the qualifying matches were not open to the public.

Seeds

Qualifiers

Lucky losers

Qualifying draw

First qualifier

Second qualifier

Third qualifier

Fourth qualifier

Fifth qualifier

Sixth qualifier

Seventh qualifier

Eighth qualifier

Ninth qualifier

Tenth qualifier

Eleventh qualifier

Twelfth qualifier

Thirteenth qualifier

Fourteenth qualifier

Fifteenth qualifier

Sixteenth qualifier

See also
 2021 US Open – Women's singles qualifying

References

External links
  Men's Singles Qualifying Draw
2021 US Open – Men's draws and results at the International Tennis Federation

Men's Singles Qualifying
US Open (tennis) by year – Qualifying